Willie Whistle was a local Boston children's television character of the late 20th century. He hosted a local children's show from 1967 to 1987.

Willie Whistle, a seagoing clown, was played by Dick Beach. Beach created the character of Salty the Clown as a fill-in for a local Toledo, Ohio show, Fun Farm. In 1960, he was given his own show, The Adventures of Salty and Friends. The Salty character featured a tiny whistle sitting on Beach's tongue that changed his voice to a high-pitched squeak. He performed skits with another character, Captain Cotton, and introduced cartoons.

Beach was recruited by Boston's new UHF channel, WSBK-TV (UHF channel 38) to host a show there, starting in 1967. He kept the Salty character, but was required to rename it, since Salty was the nickname of a recent Massachusetts senator (Leverett Saltonstall). The name Willie Whistle was chosen. Beach was also promotions director at the station.

Beach's character thrived in the larger Boston market, despite his speech being largely unintelligible such that he was provided with an off-screen interpreter. The Willie Whistle character continued on the air in Boston for twenty years, until 1987, when Beach retired for health reasons. Beach died on December 18, 2018, at the age of 90.

References

External links

American clowns
1967 American television series debuts
1987 American television series endings
1960s American children's comedy television series
1970s American children's comedy television series
1980s American children's comedy television series
Television shows about clowns
Children's television characters
Local children's television programming in the United States